"Mr. Banker" is a song by American Southern rock band Lynyrd Skynyrd. It was recorded in early 1973 at Studio One, Doraville, Georgia, and was first released as the B-side of "Gimme Three Steps" (a U.S. single release) in November 1973. It was not featured on any album until the compilation album Legend in 1987. It was also included as a bonus track on the 2001 reissue of the band's debut album, (Pronounced 'Lĕh-'nérd 'Skin-'nérd).

The song was written by Ronnie Van Zant, Gary Rossington, and Ed King.

Content
The song is notable for its lyrics and simple blues guitar riff. The song is sung by Ronnie Van Zant, about a man begging the bank for money to bury his father. Despite misconceptions, the song is not about Van Zant's father, Lacy Van Zant.

References

1973 songs
Lynyrd Skynyrd songs
Songs written by Ronnie Van Zant
Songs written by Gary Rossington
Songs written by Ed King
Songs about occupations
Songs about poverty
MCA Records singles